The Permanent Committee on Place Names (PCPN) created from the various Australian and New Zealand committees on geographical names.
The PCPN started in 1984 as the Committee for Geographical Names in Australia (CGNA) and it was renamed in 2005.
It was integrated within the Intergovernmental Committee on Surveying and Mapping (ICSM) in 1993. It is also associated with the Geospatial and Earth Monitoring Division of Geoscience Australia.
It contributes to the United Nations Group of Experts on Geographical Names.

Annual meetings
Annual meetings followed at:-

Bathurst (NSW) - 1985
Adelaide - 1986
Darwin - 1987
Brisbane - 1988
Hobart - 2010
Adelaide - 2011
Brisbane - 2012
Canberra - 2013

Official authorities
The authorities that work on geographic names and are members of the committee, and the enabling legislation, are as follows:

 Australian Capital Territory - National Memorials Committee - National Memorials Ordinance 1928
New South Wales - Geographical Names Board of New South Wales - Geographical Names Act 1966
New Zealand Geographic Board Ng Pou Taunaha o Aotearoa
 Northern Territory - Place Names Committee for the Northern Territory - Place Names Act 1978
 Queensland - The Department of Geographic information -  Queensland Place Names Act 1988
 South Australia - Geographical Names Board of South Australia - Geographical Names Act  1969
 Tasmania - Nomenclature Board of Tasmania - Survey Co-ordination Act 1944 amendments of 1955 and 1964
 Victoria - Place Names Committee - Survey Co-ordination (Place Names) Act 1965, updated to Geographic Place Names Act 1998
 Western Australia - Geographic Names Committee - Land Administration Act 1997 (was originally the Nomenclature Advisory Committee, appointed in 1936 ); Western Australian Place Names and Addressing

Additional members
 Antarctic Names Committee of Australia
 Australian Surveying and Land Information Group
 Department of Defence - Army
 Department of Defence - Navy

See also
Gazetteer of Australia
Suburbs and localities (Australia)
Surveying in Australia

References

Further reading
 Committee for Geographic Names in Australia (1989) Authorities and organizations involved with geographic names in Australia (The 1988 edition and compilation was the responsibility of Brian Goodchild - Secretary of the Geographic Names Committee - Department of Land Administration Perth, Western Australia.)

External links

Names of places in Australia
Geography of New Zealand
Geocodes
Names of places in New Zealand
Geographical naming agencies